Ockel Sirius B is a pocket PC. Its makers claim it is the smallest portable Windows 10 PC. The Ockel Sirius B is a co-production of Ockel Products and Avanca International, both based in The Hague, Netherlands.

Overview 
The Sirius B was launched on October 28, 2015. A quad-core Intel Atom processor, 2 GB of RAM, 32 GB internal storage and Intel HD graphics.

Ockel Products raised $361,331 for the production of the Ockel Sirius B by crowd funding through Indiegogo.  both the first version of the Sirius B and the Ockel Sirius B Black Cherry are available.

See also 
 List of computer hardware manufacturers

References 

Pocket computers
Crowdfunded consumer goods
Products introduced in 2015
Dutch inventions
Indiegogo projects